Balboa is a genus of dirt-colored seed bugs in the family Rhyparochromidae. There are at least three described species in Balboa.

Species
These three species belong to the genus Balboa:
 Balboa ampliata (Barber, 1918)
 Balboa germana (Distant, 1893)
 Balboa variabilis Distant, 1893

References

Further reading

 
 
 
 

Rhyparochromidae
Articles created by Qbugbot